Victims of the Modern Age is the second studio album by Arjen Anthony Lucassen's progressive metal project/supergroup Star One, released on the recording label Inside Out in the US on 25 October 2010 and in Europe on 1 November 2010. The album continues the style introduced on Star One's previous studio album by mixing progressive metal and space rock.

Like on their previous album, the themes of the album's songs are based on science fiction movies or TV series, however it is focused on dystopian or post-apocalyptic movies. The title of the album is a quote from Kubrick's film A Clockwork Orange.

The album was released in two editions: a regular, and a special edition with 2 CDs. It was also the first time Lucassen released a second studio album with one of his side-projects.

The cover art depicts the Holocaust Memorial in Berlin, with the people on top not to scale.

Reception 

Victims of the Modern Age has received critical acclaim, with many critics praising Lucassen's composition abilities and the voices of the four singers: Craig Hartranft of DangerDog.com stated that "Lucassen and his talented crew have created a terrific and entertaining work, excelling beyond their past achievements" and "strongly recommended" the album, giving it the maximum rating. It was later chosen as one of the fifteen Albums of the Year by Dangerdog with the words "Arjen Anthony Lucassen is a bloody genius. He's a classical Baroque composer reborn in our time to write timeless music". Metal Storm gave the album a very good review, with the reviewer stating "In the end all I have to say is that I for one like this album, been a while since I was this happy with the end result." It also praised the singers who were "all brilliant and so different from each other". Blistering.com also gave a positive review of the album with a rating of 8/10, stating "As cliché as this sounds, Victims of the Modern Age is nothing like you’ll hear all year, the wry combination of the right tones and voices, with a batch of songs that are quite refreshing in today’s climate".

Track listing

Album themes
The names of the album's songs are based on the following science-fiction films or television shows:

"Down the Rabbit Hole" - Introductory Song/The Matrix (In allusion to Alice in Wonderland)
"Digital Rain" - The Matrix
"Earth That Was" - Firefly / Serenity
"Victim of the Modern Age" - A Clockwork Orange
"Human See, Human Do" - Planet of the Apes
"24 Hours" - Escape from New York
"Cassandra Complex" - 12 Monkeys
"It's Alive, She's Alive, We're Alive" - Children of Men
"It All Ends Here" - Blade Runner
"As the Crow Dies" - The Road
"Two Plus Two Equals Five" - Nineteen Eighty-Four
"Lastday" - Logan's Run
"Closer to the Stars" - Gattaca

Personnel 

Star One
 Sir Russell Allen – vocals
 Damian Wilson – vocals
 Dan Swanö – vocals
 Floor Jansen – vocals
 Arjen Anthony Lucassen – guitars, Hammond, mellotron, analog synths, solina strings on all tracks, lead vocals on "Lastday" and "Knife Edge"
 Peter Vink  – bass guitar
 Ed Warby – drums
 Gary Wehrkamp – guitar solos on CD1: 2, 3, 5, 7
 Joost van den Broek – keyboard solos on CD1: 2, 3, 5, 8 and CD2: 5

Additional musicians
 Tony Martin – lead vocals on "Closer to the Stars"
 Mike Andersson – lead vocals on "As the Crow Dies"
 Rodney Blaze – lead vocals on "Two Plus Two Equals Five"

Production
 Arjen Anthony Lucassen – production, mixing, mastering, recordings supervision
 Oscar Holleman – drum recordings supervision
 Thomas Ewerhard – layout
 Christophe Dessaigne – artwork, photos
 Lori Linstruth – filming and editing of "The Making of Victims of the Modern Age", management

Charts

References

External links 
 
 

Star One albums
Inside Out Music albums